The enzyme cytidylate cyclase (EC 4.6.1.6) is an enzyme that catalyzes the reaction 

CTP = 3′,5′-cyclic CMP + diphosphate

This enzyme belongs to the family of lyases, specifically the class of phosphorus-oxygen lyases.  The systematic name of this enzyme class is CTP diphosphate-lyase (cyclizing; 3′,5′-cyclic-CMP-forming). Other names in common use include 3',5'-cyclic-CMP synthase, cytidylyl cyclase, cytidyl cyclase, and CTP diphosphate-lyase (cyclizing).

References

 
 

EC 4.6.1
Enzymes of unknown structure